Young Conservatives may refer to:

Political parties

 Young Conservatives (Czech Republic), the youth wing of the Civic Democratic Party
 Young Conservatives (Denmark), the youth wing of the Conservative People's Party of Denmark
 Young Conservatives (UK), the youth wing of the United Kingdom's Conservative Party
 Young Conservatives of Texas, the nonpartisan conservative youth organization based in Texas
 European Young Conservatives, a grouping of conservative and centre-right parties in Europe